Emil Byk (born 14 January 1845 at Janów (now ), near Trembowla, in Austrian Galicia (now Terebovlia, Ukraine) - 1906) was a Polish-Austrian-Jewish lawyer and deputy.

In 1885 he was chosen the chairman of the charity committee of the Cultusrath (Board of Education) of Lemberg, and in 1902 became president of the Jewish community there. In 1890, he was a "Stadtverordneter" and president of the Shomer Israel Society. In 1891, he was elected to represent Brody and Zolochiv in the Reichsrat.

Some of his more important speeches in that body were:
 an address in 1893 against Prince Liechtenstein on the establishment of a Jewish theological seminary.
 an address on 4 May 1898 against the proposition that the sittings of the committee to consider the charges against ex-Prime Minister Kazimierz F. Graf Badeni should be public
 1898 address on the "Ausnahmeszustand" (state of emergency) in Galicia, which was very well received.

References 
 
 Bloch, Oesterreichische Wochenschrift, 1886, No. 1; 1894, No. 37; 1900, No. 43; Stenographische Protokolle des Abgeordnetenhauses, 1898, 1899, Index

1845 births
1906 deaths
People from Ternopil Oblast
People from the Kingdom of Galicia and Lodomeria
Jews from Galicia (Eastern Europe)
Jewish Austrian politicians
Jewish Polish politicians
Jewish Ukrainian politicians
Ukrainian politicians before 1991
19th-century Austrian lawyers
19th-century Austrian politicians
Jewish Austro-Hungarian politicians
Members of the Austrian House of Deputies (1891–1897)
Members of the Austrian House of Deputies (1897–1900)